The Balares were one of the three major groups among which the Nuragic Sardinians considered themselves divided (along with the Corsi and the Ilienses).

History

Pausanias in his work Periegesis speculated that the Balares were the descendants of the Iberian and African mercenaries of Carthage, adding that in the language of the Corsi, "Balares" translates to fugitives. 

In the Historiae, Sallust mentions a possible origin from the city of Palla, Corsica.

Archaeologist Giovanni Ugas proposed that they derived from the first wave of the Beaker people who settled in the island in the late Copper Age from the Franco-Iberian area and that they were related with the ancient peoples of the Balearic Islands; their name has been connected with that of Balarus, a chief of the Vettones. According to Ugas, during the Nuragic period the Balares lived in the whole north-western part of the island (Nurra, Anglona, Sassarese); their territory bordered with the Ilienses in the south (Tirso) and with the Corsi in the north-east (Mount Limbara).

After the Punic and Roman occupation of Sardinia, part of the Balares, along with the Ilienses and the Corsi, retreated in the mountainous region called Barbagia to resist the invaders. In 177 BC, the Balares and Ilienses revolted against the Romans but they were defeated by the legions of Tiberius Gracchus.

Strabo in the Geographica mention them among the "nations of mountaineers" that raided the Italian coast.

Balares tribes (Balari)
Coracenses, they dwelt south of the Tibulati and the Corsi (for whom Corsica is named) and north of the Carenses and the Cunusitani
Giddilitani
Lucuidonenses / Luquidonenses / Lugudonenses / Liguidonenses (Lugudonensi), they dwelt south of the Carenses and the Cunusitani and north of the Æsaronenses (not to be confused with the Longonenses)
Nurritani, in Nurra territory (not the same tribe as the Nurrenses or the Norenses / Noritani)
Perfugae / Perfugae Balares
Turritani
Uddadhaddaritani / Uddhadaddhar(itani) Numisiarum (part of the Balares and not of the Ilienses or Iolaes

See also
List of ancient Corsican and Sardinian tribes
Ilienses / Iolaes (Iolei)
Corsi
Paleo-Corsican language
Paleo-Sardinian language
History of Sardinia
Nuragic civilization
Sardinian people
Torrean civilization
Corsican people
Ethnic group
Tribe

Bibliography

References

Ancient peoples of Sardinia
Tribes conquered by Rome